Byrhtnoth, Ealdorman of Essex ( 931 - 11 August 991), died at the Battle of Maldon. His name is composed of the Old English beorht (bright) and noþ (courage). He is the subject of The Battle of Maldon, an Old English poem, J.R.R. Tolkien's short play in verse, The Homecoming of Beorhtnoth, Beorhthelm's Son, and a modern statue at Maldon.

Death in battle
His death, while leading the Anglo-Saxon forces against the Vikings in 991, is the subject of the famous Old English poem The Battle of Maldon. As presented there, his decision to allow the Vikings to move to a better position was heroic but fatal. He was said to stand well over six feet in height, and was around the age of sixty years at the Battle of Maldon, with "swan-white hair".  Although it is believed that he fell early in the battle, some say that it took three men to kill him, one of them almost severing Byrhtnoth's arm in the process. He had previously had several military successes, presumably also against Viking raiders.

Patronage and burial
Byrhtnoth was a patron of Ely Abbey, giving it many villages (including Spaldwick, Trumpington, Rettendon, Soham, Fulbourn, Impington, Pampisford and Teversham). He was buried there alongside Archbishop Wulfstan the homilist. The Liber Eliensis records that his widow gave the Abbey a tapestry or hanging celebrating his deeds, presumably in the style of the Bayeux Tapestry, the only surviving example of such a work. This was given immediately after his death, so had probably been hanging in his home previously.

Reburials
After his burial, his remains, along with six other Saxon 'benefactors of Ely Church' (also known as the seven 'Confessors of Christ') have been moved and reburied three times. Archbishop Wulfstan (died 1023), with six Bishops (Osmund of Sweden, Athelstan of Elmham, Ælfwine of Elmham, Ælfgar of Elmham, Eadnoth of Dorchester) and Byrhtnoth were all exhumed from their burial places in the old Saxon Abbey Church, and in the mid-1150s the remains were reinterred in the 'Northern Part' of the new Norman Church, which by then had been made Ely Cathedral.

Following the collapse of the central tower, in 1322, a new octagonal space was created, and a wall was built on its north side to separate the monastic area of the choir from the pilgrim entrance and route to the shrine of Æthelthryth (St Etheldreda). Within this wall the seven benefactors were buried, with wall paintings of each in an elaborate arcade, facing the pilgrim entrance, perhaps to remind visitors of the enduring respect that can accrue from such generosity.

The shrines were destroyed and pilgrimages ceased at the Reformation, but in 1769, when the choir stalls were moved out of the Octagon, the wall was demolished and James Bentham found that the remains of the seven benefactors were still there, each in a separate compartment, although Byrhtnoth's was headless. On 31 July 1781 they were again re-interred, with considerable ceremony, at the far east end of the cathedral, in niches constructed within the gothic splendour of Bishop Nicholas West's Chantry chapel.

Family
Byrhtnoth was married to Ælfflæd, sister of the dowager Queen Æthelflæd of Damerham, making Byrhtnoth a kinsman of King Edgar by marriage. 
Byrhtnoth and Ælfflæd are identified to have had a daughter who married Oswig, who died 5 May 1010 in the Battle of Ringmere
Byrhtnoth is reported to have had a daughter called Leofflæd, however she is not mentioned in any pre-Conquest source. This Leofflæd is likely the same as the daughter who married Oswig.

Legacy
In October 2006, a statue created by John Doubleday was placed at the end of the Maldon Promenade Walk, facing the battle site of Northey Island and the Causeway. The battle site itself has a National Trust plaque recording his 'heroic defeat and death'.

As well as the Anglo-Saxon poem, The Battle of Maldon, J.R.R. Tolkien's short alliterative play, The Homecoming of Beorhtnoth, Beorhthelm's Son takes place on the battlefield of Maldon and deals with the search for Byrhtnoth's body.

In 2015 Timebomb Comics released 'Defiant! The Legend of Brithnoth', an original graphic novel based on the story of Brithnoth and The Battle of Malden, written by Andy Winter and illustrated by Daniel Bell.

See also
 The Homecoming of Beorhtnoth Beorhthelm's Son

References

External links
 
 Maldon Battle and Campaign, Report compiled by Glenn Foard, 2003, for The UK Battlefields Resource Centre, Provided by The Battlefields Trust

991 deaths
Anglo-Saxons killed in battle
Anglo-Saxon ealdormen
Anglo-Saxon warriors
English heroic legends
People from Essex
Maldon, Essex